The Studio Tour (also known as The Backlot Tour) is a ride attraction at the Universal Studios Hollywood theme park in Universal City, California near Los Angeles. Studio Tour is the theme park's signature attraction. It travels through a working film studio, with various film sets on the Universal Studios Lot. Guests sit on multi-car trams for the duration of the ride. The tour lasts about 45–60 minutes and the tour is led by a prerecorded video guide by Jimmy Fallon. It travels through the Front Lot, Backlot and various attractions, passing sets and properties from movies along the way. The tour inspired a smaller but similar version at Universal Studios Florida, which was removed in 1995.

History

From 1915, when visitors sat on bleachers for 25 cents, to the 1964 introduction of pink and white Glamor Trams, to its current technological sophistication, the behind-the-scenes view of a working movie studio has been a large attraction of the park.

During the early years of the tram tour (1964–1965), all the attractions at Universal were seen via the tram. It originally departed from the front lot commissary. In 1965, the upper lot studio tour center opened.

As the movie studio has evolved, the tour has evolved with it. In late 1989, CD players finally gave the tour guides a chance to rest their voices. In 1999, the CD players were replaced by DVD players and LCD screens, allowing tour guides to show scenes from movies filmed at the locations the trams pass. In 2009, the screens were upgraded to high-definition. In 2011, Jimmy Fallon joined the tour as a video host to supplement the live-action narration and also appeared in some filming scenes. He also performs an original song at the end of the tour for riders. The song was temporarily removed in 2016 and now becomes a billboard signature.

Since 2006, some studio tours have bypassed the Collapsing Bridge, due to aging and wearing. However, the bridge has since undergone renovations, and was added back to the tour schedules in August 2008. Since July 2010, the Collapsing Bridge has been used as a representation of the Skull Island area for the new King Kong: 360 3-D attraction.

Like its parent theme park, its closure in mid-March 2020 caused tours to be indefinitely shut down but was reopened in April 2021.

Film sets

Sets from the Universal movies Psycho, Back to the Future, The Sting, The Great Outdoors, and the Paramount/DreamWorks film War of the Worlds are visited in the tour. Walt Disney Studios has also used the backlot for movies such as the Pirates of the Caribbean film series, 101 Dalmatians, 102 Dalmatians, and The Princess Diaries 2: Royal Engagement, specifically for town scenes. There are also 'general purpose' sets visited, such as the neighborhood Wisteria Lane from Desperate Housewives, and a neighborhood that is made to look like an old west town. This neighborhood has six streets, each with the essentials of a saloon and sheriffs station. Before the advent of sound, up to six westerns could be shot at once. The tour also winds through sound stages, and the tour guide explains what movies, television shows, music videos, commercials, and/or still camera photo shoots are currently shooting on the lot. Stage One, where The Tonight Show with Conan O'Brien was filmed from June 2009 to January 2010, was added to the tour. O'Brien and announcer Andy Richter staged events outside the studio on occasion as part of [[List of Conan O'Brien sketches#The Tonight Show's Tour-ific Tramtacular|The Tonight Shows Tour-ific Tramtacular]] sketch. The tram also passes by miniature models of the ship and Skull Island from the 2005 King Kong remake.

Until June 1, 2008, the tour also passed through a group of facades resembling city streets of New York (used in the filming of Bruce Almighty and some elements in Transformers), Bring It On: In It to Win It, and New England, as well as the Courthouse Square set famously seen in the Back to the Future trilogy. However, these sets were constructed mainly of wood and therefore were highly flammable, and burned to the ground in an early morning fire. All the sets have been rebuilt and a new attraction at the Studio features King Kong: 360 3-D, which opened July 1, 2010.

The area beside the Psycho house (known as Psycho Flats) used to be the site of Falls Lake — a large water-tank and waterfall used in numerous productions. Falls Lake was moved over the summer of 2008, and the area is currently occupied by the huge outdoor airplane-crash set built for War Of The Worlds, directed by Steven Spielberg. Spielberg and crew were on the Universal backlot for three days shooting on the massive outdoor set. A commercial Boeing 747-100SR aircraft formerly owned by All Nippon Airways was chopped into pieces and transported to Universal, where the full set has been left fully dressed as it was during filming. The only change made to the set following filming was to move the houses on the right of the tram off the road (so the tram can pass safely). As in the movie, there are no bodies in the plane wreckage, but during Halloween Horror Nights, a combination of cast members and dummies have been put in place as crash victims. This set has also been used for two music videos, The Fray's "Never Say Never" and "Fly" by Nicki Minaj.

Before returning to the tour's boarding area, the tram passes by an overlook of the San Fernando Valley, which includes views of neighboring Warner Bros. Studios in Burbank.

Staged events
The Studio Tour includes some special demonstrations, as well as some small segments. For example, an encounter with King Kong (King Kong: 360 3-D), a simulated flash flood, an 8.3 earthquake, a short encounter with Jaws, and a high-speed car chase featuring the cast from the Fast & Furious movie franchise (Fast & Furious: Supercharged).Psycho: Bates Mansion (1964)
The Psycho House was one of the big draws of the Universal Tram Tour, back in 1964, and has continued to be instantly recognizable in recent years. In 1984, the Psycho House was used in the Knight Rider episode "Halloween Knight". The episode mentions a man named Norman Baines who is supposed to be the murder suspect at a Halloween party. Also, when Michael Knight, Bonnie and KITT arrive at the house, Michael mentions that "Boy, this place looks really familiar" before he says "Nah!". During production of the film Man on the Moon, a biopic about Andy Kaufman's life story, in 1999 at an area near the house, Jim Carrey, who portrayed Kaufman in the film, became bored during break hours and tried to channel Kaufman's creative energy by playing Norman Bates. Dressing up as "mother" and wielding a rubber knife, Carrey emerged from behind the Psycho house and jumped on the tram, scaring the passengers, including the guides. The tour guides and tram operators reported the incident to the film crew, who told them that the person in the costume was none other than a bored Jim Carrey himself. Carrey wanted to repeat the stunt one year later while filming How The Grinch Stole Christmas, which was being filmed behind the house, but this time in full Grinch costume. However, he was stopped by the production that wanted to keep his costume and make-up under wraps until the film came out. The park, however, kept Carrey's idea and have cast actors dressed as Norman Bates slowly approach the tram with a rubber knife.Flash Flood (1968)
The downhill flood effect has appeared in many films, including Big Fat Liar and Fletch Lives. There is a story that when a group of dignitaries and celebrities including John Wayne visited the Flash Flood in the early days, the water levels were still being perfected and the group got soaked.Jaws (1976)
The Jaws event opened a year after the release of Steven Spielberg's 1975 film. It is an attraction that features the moving shark anamatronic from the film and other sets. The actual hero prop boat 'Orca' was placed in the lagoon as a center piece, but was removed between 1991 and 1992 and chopped up for timber (Jaws director Steven Spielberg learned of the fate of the 'Orca', much to his anger, after noticing it gone while he was on the ride). The shark as seen in the attraction has had cameos in multiple television shows and films including the made-for-TV film The Harlem Globetrotters on Gilligan's Island in 1981, the episode "Hooray for Hollywood" from Diff'rent Strokes in 1984, and the episode "Fright Knight" from Knight Rider in 1986. The Amity Harbor/Village area that is associated with the Jaws attraction (minus the moving shark) was the set used in two Airwolf episodes "The American Dream" (Season 2) and "Where Have All the Children Gone" (Season 3).Earthquake (1989)
The Earthquake event is an 8.3 earthquake inside a soundstage, designed to make it look like a San Francisco subway station. They have a hot set; a hot set is a stage in which various props stay in use and cannot be moved. The attraction features a gimbal which allows it to shake the tram, a burning gasoline truck that collapses through the roof, fire and spark effects, a derailing subway train, and a flood of water. The attraction resets itself within just 15 seconds to prepare itself for the next tramload of guests.Jurassic Park (1996)
When the tram passes through the Isla Nublar set, guests are sprayed by animatronic Dilophosaurus. It is very similar to the end of the Jurassic World ride. Prior to the event, the tram also passes props and vehicles from the original Jurassic Park films.Psycho: Bates Motel (2008)
As the tram passes the Bates Motel, the guests witness Norman Bates carrying a corpse to a car. After placing the body in the trunk, he notices the tram and walks towards it with a kitchen knife as the tram leaves just in time to escape. Bates is portrayed by an Anthony Perkins lookalike and on some occasions, a Vince Vaughn lookalike. If the actors are not available, a cardboard cutout of Anthony Perkins as Bates is used in the Cabin 1 window.King Kong: 360 3-D (2010) 

Studio Tour guests wear 3-D glasses as the tram enters a sound stage dressed as a recreation of Skull Island. Two Venatosaurus creatures attack and begin to chase the tram, which disturbs King Kong, who begins to fight them. The fight continues from one side of the tram to the other, as air and water effects are blown onto guests to further the illusion. Near the end of the experience, a V-Rex gets a hold of what is supposed to be the last tram car and pulls it from the train, throwing it down a pit. Kong defeats the V-Rex and roars in triumph. Previously, the tour showed a large pond area with a small-scale boat to show how the filming of the boat arriving to Skull Island was done.Fast & Furious: Supercharged (2015)

Fast & Furious: Supercharged is located at the former site of the Curse of the Mummy's Tomb tunnel. This ride opened on June 25, 2015.Nighttime Studio Tours (2015)
In celebration of Universal Studios Hollywood 50th anniversary, the Nighttime Studio Tour complements the popular daytime experience by offering a nighttime tour of the famous studio backlot.Jupiter's Claim (2022)

A set themed to the western theme park of the same name from the 2022 film, Nope, which is located as the penultimate stop on the tour starting on July 22, 2022, the same day as the film's theatrical release, marking it as the first time that an attraction on the tour has opened day and date with a movie release. The set, which was disassembled during post-production and transported to, and reconstructed on site in, the park, with props and details from the film, was originally created by the film's production designer, Ruth DeJong.

 Former events Avalanche Tunnel (1974–2001)
The tour guide leads the tram into a revolving tunnel, simulating an avalanche, including fake snow spinning around the tram, and damaged signs, along with special sound effects. It was replaced by Curse of the Mummy's Tomb.Rockslide (1974–1979)
The tram stops inside a rock cliff which begins to collapse. The tram gets past the cliff safely, but not before having a collision with the rocks. The attraction was replaced by Battle of Galactica in 1979.Runaway Train (1974–1985)
The tour guide leads the tram across a train track, thinking it is safe to cross. However, a train suddenly rushes from the tracks and stops just in time before colliding with the tram. The guide leads the tram away from the tracks to safety. The train is now a stationary train in the backlot.Battle of Galactica (1979–1992)
This high-technology attraction featuring animatronics and live actors in a spectacular laser battle based on the television series Battlestar Galactica with a 200-foot-long spaceship that "swallowed" the passengers, opened June 9, 1979. This was the first themed attraction to feature Audio-Animatronics characters outside Disney Parks, and was the first dark ride to combine sophisticated animatronics and lasers with live actors. At a cost of $1 million, it was the most expensive special effects attraction ever built at the park at the time. It was replaced in 1992 by the foundations of Back to the Future: The Ride.King Kong Encounter (1986–2008)
The tram enters 1976 New York City where King Kong is on the loose and grabs and shakes the tram, which eventually escapes his grasp and gets out of the city safely. The 7-ton,  Kong figure was the largest and most complex animatronic figure in existence for many years. The sophistication of the attraction broke new ground and paved the way for today's themed attractions, including a Universal Studios Florida version. The Kong sequence was also featured in the film The Wizard starring Fred Savage and Indie singer Jenny Lewis.  This attraction opened on June 14, 1986, and was completely destroyed by a fire in the early morning of June 1, 2008. As of June 3, 2008, Universal Studios officials stated that the experience would not be rebuilt, and instead was replaced by the new King Kong: 360 3-D attraction, based on the 2005 film.Curse of the Mummy's Tomb (2001–2013)
The tram guide tells guests that they are going to take a look at some props from the film The Mummy, but instead the tram is led into Imhotep's cursed tomb, where he sucks them into a powerful revolving sandstorm. The guide eventually leads the tram out of the sandstorm, and Imhotep is defeated.

The Curse of the Mummy's Tomb closed on September 3, 2013 and was later demolished in the same month. It was confirmed on April 8, 2014 that the site would become home to the new Fast and Furious attraction, replaced by Fast & Furious: Supercharged, which opened on June 25, 2015.
 The Fast & The Furious: Extreme Close-Up (2006–2013)

Extreme Close-up demonstrates some of the special effects used in The Fast & The Furious: Tokyo Drift. The attraction started construction in March 2006 and opened on June 15, 2006. The area was formerly occupied by a model used in Dante's Peak.

The section was closed in late July 2013. The studio had become increasingly frustrated with the portrayal of its Fast and Furious franchise at Universal Studios Hollywood after the blockbuster success of the sixth film. This frustration eventually led to the unplanned closure of Fast and Furious on the Studio Tour after producers from the film witnessed the attraction first-hand.The Collapsing Bridge (1974–2006, 2008–2010, 2013, 2014)
The tour guide tries to take the tram around a bridge rather than going over it, but suddenly the tram driver takes the tram towards the bridge. Just as the tram reaches the midpoint of the bridge, it creaks and massive timbers fall away, causing the bridge to "drop" the tram a short distance. The tram drives on and guests can see the bridge rebuild itself for the next tram.

The bridge was used less-frequently starting in 2005, and by March 2006 was no longer part of the regular tram tour due to mechanical problems. The Collapsing Bridge was repaired and returned as part of the Studio Tour in August 2008, after the June fire had closed much of the normal tram route. As of July 2010, King Kong: 360 3-D is located in front of the Collapsing Bridge. The bridge itself is still there, but King Kong: 360 3-D has replaced it. The current route is blocked by a crushed tram, used as set dressing for King Kong.King Kong Sea (2006–2016)
The guide leads the tram to a body of water around Skull Mountain Island. Suddenly, the waves part, and the tram travels between them, and guests get a view of the mini island.  Prior to the promotion of King Kong, guides informed guests that the waterfall effect was originally installed for the "parting of the Red Sea" scene from The Ten Commandments.  The surrounding pond was also featured as part of the film set from The Creature from the Black Lagoon.  For many years a mock-up of the creature stood in the pond.Whoville Comes To Life''' (2008–2016)
During the holiday season, at the Whoville set all of the Whos, even Max the dog, perform a musical spectacular for the guests' enjoyment. The songs are remixes of songs from the movie. This is part of Universal's Grinchmas celebration.

In 2017, with the addition of "The Magic of Christmas at Hogwarts Castle" projection mapping and fireworks show in the Wizarding World of Harry Potter, Whoville Comes To Life was closed to appease nearby neighbors who would frequently complain about noise caused by the Whoville show and the extended Studio Tour hours.

In 2020, during the COVID-19 closure of Universal Studios Hollywood, the Whoville Sets were demolished and replaced with picture cars seen in Universal films and in the theme park.

Notable tour guides

 John Badham, Director
 Michael Hitchcock, Actor
 Michael Ovitz, Entertainment Executive
 Randy Pitchford, Video Game Developer
 Benjamin Salisbury, Actor
 Tony Sepulveda, Vice President of Casting, Warner Bros.
 Ryan Slattery, Actor
 Jack Wagner, Singer and Actor
 James Kyson Lee, Actor
 Conan O'Brien, Host of Conan and former host of The Tonight Show Ron Howard, Director
 Jimmy Fallon, actor and current host of The Tonight Show''
 Cecilia Peck, Actress, Director, Daughter of Gregory Peck
 Brian Clark, Actor
 Whoopi Goldberg, Actress
Paul Feig, Director
Scott Gairdner, Writer, Podcaster

Photo gallery

See also

 Universal Studios Studio Tour (Florida)
 Studio Backlot Tour, a similar attraction at Disney's Hollywood Studios that eventually got demolished

References

External links
 Official site

1964 establishments in California
Universal Studios Hollywood
Universal Parks & Resorts attractions by name
Amusement rides introduced in 1964
Amusement rides based on film franchises
Animatronic attractions
Backlot sets